The Constitution of Togo was formally adopted on the 14th of October 1992, and last revised in 2007.

Former Constitutions
 1960 Constitution
 1963 Constitution
 1979 Constitution

External links
Constitution of Togo
Constitution of Togo

Togo
Politics of Togo
1992 documents
1992 establishments in Togo